Netherlands–Sweden relations are diplomatic relations between the kingdoms of Sweden and the Netherlands. Both are full members of the European Union. The Netherlands has an embassy in Stockholm, while Sweden has an embassy in The Hague.

History
The Dutch Republic and the Kingdom of Sweden have been both allied and on opposing sides during both the Northern Wars and the Franco-Dutch war. The Dutch fought against Sweden during the Second Northern War, from 1655-1660. It later allied itself with Sweden in the Scanian War and later in the Great Northern War; contributing 13 ships of the line  to Sweden's 76,000 troop army 
In July 2022, the Netherlands have fully ratified Sweden's NATO membership application.

See also  
 Foreign relations of the Netherlands 
 Foreign relations of Sweden
 Dutch people in Sweden

References

Sources
 

 
Sweden
Bilateral relations of Sweden